Schefflera diplodactyla is a species of plant in the family Araliaceae. It is endemic to Ecuador.

References

diplodactyla
Endemic flora of Ecuador
Vulnerable flora of South America
Taxonomy articles created by Polbot
Taxobox binomials not recognized by IUCN